James Comrie was a Scottish professional footballer who played in the Scottish League for Airdrieonians and Dundee as a half back. He also played in the Southern League for Reading.

Personal life 
Comrie's relatives George, James and Malcolm were also footballers.

Career statistics

References 

Scottish footballers
Year of birth missing
Year of death missing
Place of birth missing
Place of death missing
Association football wing halves
Scottish Football League players
Southern Football League players
Dundee F.C. players
Reading F.C. players
Armadale F.C. players
Airdrieonians F.C. (1878) players
King's Park F.C. players
Comrie family